Nguyễn Ngọc Tư is a Vietnamese short story writer and novelist from Cà Mau Province in the Mekong Delta. She has received various awards, including the Southeast Asian Writers Award in 2008 and the Vietnam Writers' Association Award for her most famous work Cánh đồng bất tận (The Endless Field) in 2006. Cánh đồng bất tận has been translated into Korean, Swedish, and English. For this book which is translated in German as Endlose Felder Tư also received the German Liberaturpreis 2018 award at the Frankfurt Book Fair.

Floating Lives, a movie based on the book, has generated revenues of 17 billion VND in 2010 (around 0.8 million USD).

The first collection of NNT's stories in English, Floating Lives, was published in 2012.

Major works
 Ngọn đèn không tắt (The Inextinguishable Light, 2000)
 Ông ngoại (Grandpa, 2001)
 Biển người mênh mông (The Ocean of People, 2003)
 Giao thừa (New Year's Eve, 2003)
 Nước chảy mây trôi (Flowing Waters, Flying Clouds, 2004)
 Cánh đồng bất tận (The Endless Field, 2005)
 Sống chậm thời @ (Slow Life in the @ Era, 2006 - co-author Lê Thiếu Nhơn)
 Ngày mai của những ngày mai (Tomorrow of Tomorrows, 2007)
 Sầu trên đỉnh Puvan (The Sorrow Trees of Puvan Mountain, 2007)
 Gió lẻ và 9 câu chuyện khác ('Single Wind' and 9 More Stories, 2008)
 Biển của mỗi người (The Sea of Every Person, 2008) 
 Yêu người ngóng núi (Missing You as I Look at Mountain, 2009)
 Khói trời lộng lẫy (Fabulous Clouds in the Sky, 2010)
 Bánh trái mùa xưa (The Confectionery of the Past, 2012) 
 Sông (River, novel, 2012)
 Chấm (Dot, poem, 2013)
 Đảo (Island, 2014)
 Đong tấm lòng (Measure the Sincere Heart, 2015)
 Không ai qua sông (Nobody crosses the river, 2016)
 Gọi xa xôi (Call far away, poem, 2017)
 Cố định một đám mây (Permanent a cloud, 2018)
 Hành lý hư vô (Nothingness luggage, 2019)

References

Living people
1976 births
Vietnamese novelists
Vietnamese women short story writers
Vietnamese short story writers
People from Cà Mau Province
21st-century Vietnamese women